Ramón Berdomás (24 April 1900 – 19 April 1963) was a Spanish swimmer. He competed in the water polo at the 1920 Summer Olympics and the men's 4 × 200 metre freestyle relay event at the 1924 Summer Olympics.

References

External links
 

1900 births
1963 deaths
Spanish male freestyle swimmers
Spanish male water polo players
Olympic swimmers of Spain
Olympic water polo players of Spain
Water polo players at the 1920 Summer Olympics
Swimmers at the 1924 Summer Olympics
Swimmers from Barcelona
20th-century Spanish people